

P

Notes
  PAR is common IATA code for Charles de Gaulle Airport , Orly Airport , Paris–Le Bourget Airport , Beauvais–Tillé Airport , Pontoise – Cormeilles Aerodrome , Châlons Vatry Airport  and Vélizy – Villacoublay Air Base .

References

 
  - includes IATA codes
 
 Aviation Safety Network - IATA and ICAO airport codes
 Great Circle Mapper - IATA, ICAO and FAA airport codes

P